Tang Darreh-ye Gharbi (also Romanized as Tang Darreh-ye Gharbī; also known as Tang Darreh) is a village in Sakht Sar Rural District, in the Central District of Ramsar County, Mazandaran Province, Iran. At the 2006 census, its population was 273, in 78 families.

References 

Populated places in Ramsar County